Hobson R. Reynolds (September 13, 1898 – February 4, 1991) owned a funeral home, was a state legislator, public official, and judge who lived in Pennsylvania. He served in the Pennsylvania General Assembly.

He was born in Winton, North Carolina. He received the Elks Lovejoy Award. He was photographed with and corresponded with Martin Luther King Jr.

He was a leader in the Elks. He is buried at the Hobson R. Reynolds National Elks Shrine in Winton, North Carolina.

See also
List of African-American officeholders (1900-1959)

References

1898 births
1991 deaths
African-American state legislators in Pennsylvania
African-American judges
Members of the Benevolent and Protective Order of Elks